The Ruben M. Torres Unit is a state prison for men located in Hondo, Medina County, Texas, owned and operated by the Texas Department of Criminal Justice.  This facility was opened in January 1993, and a maximum capacity of 1384 male inmates held at various security levels.

References

Prisons in Texas
Buildings and structures in Medina County, Texas
1993 establishments in Texas